John Miller CBE (born 1930) is a British architect. He is best known for major projects with universities and museums in England and Scotland including Tate Britain, the Whitechapel Gallery, the Fitzwilliam Museum, the Scottish National Gallery, and Newham College, Cambridge. Sir Nicholas Serota, a British curator and former director of the Tate and the Whitechapel Gallery, has commented on Miller's work: "Like a well cut suit, the elegance of his architectural language has an ease which conceals the rigour and determination of his practice".

Career 
Miller studied at the Architectural Association (AA) from 1950 to 1956, where his tutors included British architect Peter Smithson. He attended the AA alongside Patrick Hodgkinson, Kenneth Frampton and Neave Brown and other prominent British architects and critics. The AA has described Miller as one of "the golden generation of post-war [AA] students". After graduating from the AA, in the late 1950s and early 1960s Miller worked for architectural firms in London including Lyons Israel Ellis.

In 1961 Miller co-founded the architectural practice Colquhoun + Miller with British architect Alan Colquhoun. Miller's wife Su Rogers joined the practice in 1986. In 1989 Colquhoun left the practice, which became John Miller and Partners. Notable projects completed by Miller and the firm included:

 Forest Gate School, London (1965);
 Royal Holloway chemistry laboratories (1970);
 Pillwood House in Cornwall (1974), which was awarded Grade ll listed status by Historic England in 2017;
 an extension and renovation of the Whitechapel Gallery, which won a RIBA Regional Architecture Award (1987);
 the Queen's Building, University of East Anglia, which won a RIBA National Award for Architecture (1995);
 a renovation of the Serpentine Gallery (1998);
 the Centenary Development at Tate Britain, which was the most significant change to the gallery since its creation in 1897, adding 10 new and five refurbished exhibition spaces (2001);
 the new Horner-Markwick Library at Newham College, Cambridge (2004);
 the courtyard extension of the Fitzwilliam Museum, Cambridge (2004);
 the Weston link connecting the Scottish National Gallery and the Royal Scottish Academy in Edinburgh (2004).

In 2006 Miller was awarded a CBE for his architectural work and contributions towards conservation.

During his career, Miller had various academic appointments including Visiting Critic at Cornell University (1966-71), Visiting Critic at Princeton University (1970), Professor of Environmental Design at the Royal College of Art (1975-85), Visiting Professor at Dublin University (1985-86), Visiting Professor at University of Manchester (1986-89), Fellow of Royal College of Art (1976), Fellow of Royal Society of Arts (1984) and Honorary Fellow of the Royal College of Art (1985).

References 

1930 births
Living people
20th-century British architects
21st-century British architects